Vaceuchelus vallesi is a species of sea snail, a marine gastropod mollusc in the family Chilodontidae.

Description
The height of this yellow shell attains 2.3 mm.

Distribution
This marine species occurs off the Philippines.

References

External links
 

vallesi
Gastropods described in 2006